Dhoul Ranjha is a village and Union council of Phalia Tehsil in Mandi Bahauddin District of Punjab, Pakistan.
Javed Imran Ranjha Advocate Supreme Court of Pakistan belongs to village Dhaul Ranjha, along with Barrister Asad Ali Ranjha.

Overview
It is located at an altitude of 201 metres above sea level and lies about 18 km from Mandi Bahauddin in southeast direction. The nearest police station is Phalia Police Station, which is about 5 km to the east. The population of village is around 7,000. Most of the population are farmers.

Education
The basic facilities of education are available in village. The Government shahid munir shaeed High School for Boys  is present in the village as well. As village also hosts Government High School for Girls.
There are four Schools in the village.One primary School and the rest two are High Schools.

References

Villages in Phalia Tehsil
Villages in Mandi Bahauddin District
Union councils of Mandi Bahauddin District